Tappeh Kabud-e Hasan Gholami (also Romanized as Tappeh Kabūd-e Ḩasan Gholāmī) is a village in Ozgoleh Rural District, Ozgoleh District, Salas-e Babajani County, Kermanshah Province, Iran. At the 2006 census, its population was 55, in 7 families.

References 

Populated places in Salas-e Babajani County